Solitaire is a Canadian drama film, directed by Francis Damberger and released in 1991. The film stars Paul Coeur and Valerie Pearson as Burt and Maggie, smalltown residents whose friendship is tested when Al (Michael Hogan), Burt's high school best friend and Maggie's ex-fiancé, returns home for a visit on Christmas Eve for the first time since his enlistment in the Vietnam War.

The film won seven Rosies at the Alberta Film and Television Awards in 1992, including Best Director (Damberger), Best Actor (Coeur), Best Actress (Pearson), Best Screenplay (Damberger), Best Art Direction (John Blackie) and Best Editing (Lenka Svab). It received four Genie Award nominations at the 13th Genie Awards, for Best Actress (Pearson), Best Supporting Actor (Hogan), Best Original Screenplay (Damberger) and Best Original Score (Michael Becker). Hogan won the Genie for Best Supporting Actor.

References

External links
 

1991 films
Canadian drama films
English-language Canadian films
Films shot in Alberta
Films set in Alberta
1990s English-language films
1990s Canadian films